Charly Ndjoume (born 11 November 1986) is a Cameroonian swimmer. He competed in the men's 50 metre freestyle at the 2020 Summer Olympics.

References

External links
 

1986 births
Living people
Cameroonian male swimmers
Cameroonian male freestyle swimmers
Olympic swimmers of Cameroon
Swimmers at the 2020 Summer Olympics
People from Littoral Region (Cameroon)
Swimmers at the 2022 Commonwealth Games
Commonwealth Games competitors for Cameroon
20th-century Cameroonian people
21st-century Cameroonian people